Troy Lifford is a Canadian politician, who was elected to the Legislative Assembly of New Brunswick in the 2010 provincial election. He represented the electoral district of Fredericton-Nashwaaksis as a member of the Progressive Conservatives until the 2014 provincial election, when he was defeated by Stephen Horsman in the redistributed seat of Fredericton North.

Cabinet positions

References

Progressive Conservative Party of New Brunswick MLAs
Living people
Members of the Executive Council of New Brunswick
21st-century Canadian politicians
Year of birth missing (living people)